Libertad, the Spanish word for "freedom", may refer to:

Places

Argentina
Libertad, Buenos Aires Province
Libertad Department, Chaco

Colombia
La Libertad Province

Ecuador
Libertad, Ecuador, a small town damaged in the 1949 Ambato earthquake
La Libertad, Ecuador, in western Santa Elena
La Libertad Canton

El Salvador
La Libertad, La Libertad, a city in La Libertad Department
La Libertad Department (El Salvador), one of the 14 divisions of El Salvador

Guatemala
La Libertad, Huehuetenango
La Libertad, Petén

Mexico
Libertad, Chihuahua, a locality in Jiménez Municipality, Chihuahua
La Libertad, Chiapas
Libertad, Tabasco, a section in Paraíso, Tabasco
La Libertad, Veracruz, a town affected by Tropical Storm Jose (2005)

Nicaragua
La Libertad, Chontales

Peru
Department of La Libertad

Philippines
Libertad, Butuan, a western part of Butuan, Agusan del Norte, Philippines
Libertad, Antique
Libertad, Misamis Oriental, a 5th class municipality in the province of Misamis Oriental
La Libertad, Negros Oriental, a third class municipality in the province of Negros Oriental
La Libertad, Zamboanga del Norte, a 5th class municipality in the province of Zamboanga del Norte
Libertad station, an LRT station in Pasay's Libertad area
Libertad Street, a road in Pasay, Philippines

United States
La Libertad, California

Uruguay
Libertad, Uruguay

Venezuela
Libertad, Anzoátegui
Libertad, Barinas, a municipal seat in Barinas, Venezuela
Libertad, Cojedes, a municipal seat in Cojedes, Venezuela

Film and television
La Libertad (film), a 2001 Argentine film
Libertad (film), a 2021 Spanish-Belgian film
Libertad (TV series), a 2021 Spanish television series
Libertad, the merged tribe on Survivor: Nicaragua
Libertad, a starship in the 2006 anime series Strain: Strategic Armored Infantry

Music

Albums
Libertad (Delirious? album), 2002
Libertad (La Ley album), 2003
Libertad (Velvet Revolver album), 2007

Songs
"Libertad" (Ivy Queen song), a 2005 single by Ivy Queen
"Libertad", a song by Anahí and Christian Chávez
"Libertad", a song by Breed 77 from the album In My Blood (En Mi Sangre)
"Libertad", a song by Tribal Seeds from the 2009 album The Harvest
"La Libertad" (Álvaro Soler song), a song from his album Mar de Colores (Versión Extendida)

Sports
Club Libertad, a professional football club from Paraguay
Libertad de Trujillo, a Peru football club, located in the city of Trujillo, La Libertad
Libertad de Sunchales or Club Deportivo Libertad, a professional basketball club from Sunchales, Santa Fe province, Argentina
Libertad F.C. (Ecuador), a professional football club from Loja
Libertad F.C. (El Salvador), a defunct professional football club from La Libertad

People
Libertad (name), various people with the surname or given name
Albert Libertad (1875–1908), pseudonym of Albert Joseph, anarchic writer and activist

Ships
Libertad (schooner) 1847, chartered by the U.S. Navy during the Mexican–American War
Chilean battleship Libertad, original name of British Royal Navy battleship HMS Triumph
ARA Libertad, several ships of the Argentine Navy
ARA Libertad (Q-2), a training ship in service since 1963

Other uses
Libertad (coin), gold and silver bullion coins issued by Mexico
Libertad (crater), a crater on the planet Mars
Libertad Digital, an advocacy journalism online newspaper edited in Madrid, Spain
Liberty Movement or Movimiento Libertad, a political party in Peru
Cuban Liberty and Democratic Solidarity (Libertad) Act of 1996, a US embargo against Cuba
Libertad, character in the comic strip Mafalda
Libertad (newspaper), a newspaper published in Valladolid, Spain from 1931 to 1979
Libertad, an insurgent group from the video game Far Cry 6

See also
La Libertad (disambiguation)
Libertad Municipality (disambiguation)
¡Tierra y Libertad! (disambiguation)